Eucorma is a genus of moths belonging to the family Zygaenidae.

Species
Species:

Eucorma euphaena 
Eucorma hampsoni 
Eucorma intercisa 
Eucorma obliquaria

References

Zygaenidae
Zygaenidae genera
Chalcosiinae